Satkhira Government Mahila College is situated in the Satkhira District, the Khulna Division of Bangladesh. It is the district's only institution of higher education for girls. It was established on July 1, 1974, and nationalized on November 1st, 1984. It runs higher secondary Degree and Honours programs.

References

 Women's universities and colleges in Bangladesh
Colleges affiliated to National University, Bangladesh
Educational institutions of Khulna Division
Educational institutions established in 1974
1974 establishments in Bangladesh